The Church of Saint Clement of Ohrid often called simply Soborna Crkva (Соборна црква), located in Skopje, North Macedonia is the largest cathedral of the Macedonian Orthodox Church today.

Architecture 

The construction of the Orthodox Cathedral church, designed by Slavko Brezoski, began in 1972 and was consecrated on 12 August 1990, on the 1150th anniversary of the birth of the church patron, St. Clement of Ohrid. This rotunda type church, with 36m x 36m dimension, composed only of domes and arches, is one of the most interesting architectural examples in recent Macedonian history. The main church is dedicated to St. Clement of Ohrid, and the church below to the Holy Mother. One of the chapels is dedicated to Emperor Constantine and Empress Helena, and the other to St. Mina, the martyr. The icons in the iconostasis were painted by Gjorgji Danevski and Spase Spirovski and the frescoes were painted by academic painter Jovan Petrov and his collaborators.

Under the central dome there is a 3.5 m high archbishopric throne. The two chairs opposite of it are each 2 meters high and according to local catechisms, are intended for the ruler of the world and his empress. The Central dome has an area of 650 m². The frescoes are works of the academic painter Jovan Petrov and his collaborators. Uniquely, in this church Jesus Christ is painted on the surface of 70 square meters, with each eye having a diameter of 1.5 m. A departure from tradition is that the Old Testament prophets are depicted as sitting instead of standing. The second departure from tradition are the large windows. To avoid large amounts of light a crystalline acrylic is placed in front of them, creating wondrous rays of color depending on the angle by which the light falls on it.
Lighting of the church is done by five tons hard polileum which is placed under the central dome. On it are arranged about 400 bulbs. The second polileum, which is in the middle, hangs over the altar in the Holy See.

A 45 meter high belfry located in the yard, left (north) from the main entrance. The total number of church bells is 3; each weighing 1000 kg, 500 kg and 300 kg respectively.

The fountain in front of the church was a gift from the Islamic religious community.

Gallery

References

External links 
360 Panorama of the church

Eastern Orthodox church buildings in North Macedonia
Macedonian Orthodox cathedrals
Clement of Ohrid
Buildings and structures in Skopje